Nifelvind is the fifth full-length album by the Finnish folk metal band Finntroll, released on February 17, 2010 through Century Media.

This album reached the highest chart result in Finland by reaching position #8. It also entered the German album charts on #31, as well as the charts in Switzerland (#41) and Austria (#61).

Track listing
All lyrics are written by Katla

Tracks 2, 4, 5, 6, 7, & 11 music by Trollhorn

Tracks 3 & 8 music by Trollhorn & Tundra

Tracks 9 & 10 music by Trollhorn & Routa

Personnel
 Mathias "Vreth" Lillmåns – vocals
 Samuli "Skrymer" Ponsimaa – guitar
 Mikael "Routa" Karlbom – guitar
 Sami "Tundra" Uusitalo – bass
 Samu "Beast Dominator" Ruotsalainen – drums
 Henri "Trollhorn" Sorvali – keyboards
 Aleksi "Virta" Virta – keyboards
Jan "Katla" Jämsen – lyrics

References

External links
 
 

Finntroll albums
2010 albums
Century Media Records albums